"The Hellgramite Method" is the forty-second episode and the seventh episode of the third season (1988–89) of the American television series The Twilight Zone. In this episode, an alcoholic has a vicious alcohol-consuming parasite implanted in him.

Plot
Miley Judson is an alcoholic who has tried quitting alcohol countless times and with countless methods, with only short-term success. He and his wife have succeeded in concealing his alcoholism from their son, but their marriage is deteriorating.

In a late night drunken stupor, Miley visits Dr. Eugene Murrick, whose Hellgramite Method for curing alcoholism he saw advertised on a box of matches. Dr. Murrick offers him a red pill. He takes the pill, and though Dr. Murrick makes contradictory statements about the treatment, Miley is too drunk to notice anything suspicious. The next day, he discovers alcohol does not intoxicate him anymore. He consults Murrick, who tells him that the pill contained a Hellgramite, a tapeworm that absorbs all alcohol in the digestive system, making it grow with each drink. The only solution is to starve the Hellgramite, but to do so prompts it to attack the host from within, causing excruciating pain. If he can endure the pain, the Hellgramite will eventually be forced into a hibernation state. But if he ever drinks another drop of alcohol the Hellgramite will re-awaken, growing stronger with each reincarnation, until it can kill the host.

Miley sends his wife and son away for a couple of weeks and dumps all the alcohol in the house down the drain. As days pass, he undergoes ever-increasing pain. Miley confronts Murrick, who reveals that the Hellgramite Method was created not to cure alcoholics, but to take revenge on them after Murrick's wife and two children were killed by a drunk driver.

Later at the bar Miley used to frequent, he approaches a man and offers him matches with the Hellgramite Method advertised on the box. He is now well-dressed and self-confident. He pays his bar tab. The bartender offers him a drink on the house but Miley declines and walks out of the bar into the sunlight.

Creature
A hellgrammite (with two Ms) is the larval form of a dobsonfly. Unlike the fictional tapeworm depicted in this episode, it is not a parasite.

External links
 

1988 American television episodes
The Twilight Zone (1985 TV series season 3) episodes
Television episodes about alcohol abuse

fr:La Méthode Hellgrammite